Parsau is a municipality in the district of Gifhorn, in Lower Saxony, Germany. The Municipality Parsau includes the villages of Ahnebeck, Croya, Kaiserwinnkel and Parsau.

References

Gifhorn (district)